Paul Gregory (August 27, 1920 – December 25, 2015)  was an American film, theatre and television producer.

Early life 
Gregory was the son of a butcher and graduated from Lincoln High School in Des Moines, Iowa, in 1938.

Career 
Gregory went to Hollywood where he worked as a personal assistant for clients like Horace Heidt and Carmen Cavallaro. He became friends with actor Charles Laughton and organized a successful lecture tour for Laughton throughout the United States between 1949 and 1950. They earned $200,000 during this reading tour; the money worked as the basis for other projects. Gregory afterwards produced 17 Broadway plays during the 1950s and 1960s, among them The Caine Mutiny Court-Martial, 3 for Tonight, The Marriage Go-Around and Lord Pengo.

Gregory read the novel The Night of the Hunter by Davis Grubb and bought the film rights. He subsequently produced the thriller The Night of the Hunter (1955), directed by Laughton. While not a success in the 1950s, the film's reputation has grown, and by 2007 was considered by film critics as a masterpiece in which Gregory played an important role. His second and last movie as a producer was The Naked and the Dead (1958). As a television producer, he won an Emmy Award in 1955 for Best Television Adaptation for his television adaption of The Caine Mutiny Court-Martial.

Gregory was also responsible for starting the acting career of his friend James Garner. He gave Garner his first acting role in his production of The Caine Mutiny Court-Martial.

Personal life 
In 1964, Gregory married former film star Janet Gaynor. Afterwards, he gradually retired from show business and raised cows, hogs, and pigeons at the large ranch of his wife. Paul Gregory and Gaynor were involved in a very serious car accident in 1982; two years later Gaynor died as a result of her injuries in this accident. In 1998, Gregory married art gallerist Kathryn Obergfel, who died three years later.

Gregory lived in his retirement in Desert Hot Springs, just north of Palm Springs, California. Gregory died in December 2015 at the age of 95 from a self-inflicted gunshot. A friend stated that Gregory "died the way he wanted" and that he was depressed about his failing physical health and that he had overlived most of his friends. His death was only reported in November 2016.

Filmography 
As a producer
 The Night of the Hunter (1955)
 Front Row Center (1955; 1 episode) 
 Ford Star Jubilee (1955/1956; 2 episodes, also writer for one)
 The Naked and the Dead (1958)
As himself
 The Ed Sullivan Show (1955)
 This Is Your Life - James Garner (1958) 
 The Hollywood Greats - Charles Laughton (1978)
 Moving Pictures (1995)
 Biography - Janet Gaynor (2001)

References

External links 
 
 Interview with Paul Gregory

1920 births
2015 deaths
American television producers
American theatre managers and producers
Businesspeople from Des Moines, Iowa
Drake University alumni
Film producers from Iowa
Suicides by firearm in California
20th-century American businesspeople
2015 suicides